Ernest Birch (3 April 1930 – 3 March 2006) was a South African cricketer. He played in two first-class matches for Border in 1947/48 and 1948/49.

See also
 List of Border representative cricketers

References

External links
 

1930 births
2006 deaths
South African cricketers
Border cricketers
Sportspeople from Dordrecht